Kampung Tok Imam Lapar is a small village in Hulu Terengganu region, Terengganu, Malaysia. 

The village is located close to the western banks of the Terengganu River.

References

External links 
   KAMPUNG IMAM LAPAR, TERENGGANU

Hulu Terengganu District
Villages in Terengganu